In economics, finance and other fields, the term sweet spot refers to the setting of a policy that results in the optimum balance of costs and benefits. For instance, the bank rate can be raised to keep inflation in check, but doing so may lower economic output by reducing investment through increased cost of capital. The sweet spot for the bank rate is where its effects on investment are low while the inflation rate remains steady.

In a more general sense, the term can be applied to any optimization issue. For instance, the sweet spot for pricing a product in the market is a balance between its affordability and its profit margin. Setting a product's price too high may lower sales at a high margin, while setting it too low may produce many low-margin sales. The sweet spot is the price where the total profit is maximized.

References
 

Decision analysis